Ibrahim I, a.k.a. Bedrettin Ibrahim , was a bey of the Karamanids, a Turkish principality in Anatolia in the 14th century.
 
His father was Mahmut Bey. His elder brother Musa had succeeded Mahmut in 1312. But soon Ibrahim laid claim to throne and rebelled in 1318. Although the details of the civil war are not known, according to Ibn Battuta, the famous Arabian traveller who acted as Ibrahim's envoy to Mamluk Sultanate of Egypt, he won the throne with the help of Mamluks. Between 1332 and 1340 he abdicated on behalf of his brother Halil. Upon Halil's death however, he resumed his former title.  His death date is not certain. But he died no sooner than 1343 when he campaigned to Armenian Kingdom of Cilicia.

References

Karamanids
1350 deaths
Year of birth unknown
14th-century monarchs in Asia
Ethnic Afshar people